Jardim da Serra (Portuguese meaning "mountain garden") is a civil parish in the municipality of Câmara de Lobos in the archipelago of Madeira. The population in 2011 was 3,311, in an area of 7.36 km². It is located in the mountains north of the centre of Câmara de Lobos.

References

Parishes of Câmara de Lobos